Zamparini is a surname. Notable people with the surname include:

Maurizio Zamparini (1941–2022), Italian businessman
Primo Zamparini (born 1939), Italian boxer

See also
 Zammarini
 Zamperini

Italian-language surnames